Jadour Haddou (born 1 January 1949) is a Moroccan runner of middle distance and 5000 metres tracks. He lives in Salé in northwestern Morocco.

Achievements

Maghreb Championships
Gold medal in 1500 m at the 1967 Maghreb Championships
Gold medal in 5000 m at the 1967 Maghreb Championships
Gold medal in 800 m at the 1969 Maghreb Championships
Bronze medal in 5000 m at the 1971 Maghreb Championships
Gold medal in 5000 m at the 1975 Maghreb Championships

Mediterranean Games
Bronze medal in 5000 m at the 1971 Mediterranean Games
Silver medal in 5000 m at the 1975 Mediterranean Games

International Military Sports Council
1971 IMSC world champion in Italy
1972 IMSC world champion in Tunis
1975 IMSC world champion in Algiers

Other titles and participations of Jadour Haddou
 15 titles of the Moroccan Championships
 semi-finalist in 1500 m at the 1968 Summer Olympics in Mexico
 1972 Summer Olympics in Munich

References

Moroccan male middle-distance runners
Living people
1949 births
Mediterranean Games silver medalists for Morocco
Mediterranean Games bronze medalists for Morocco
Mediterranean Games medalists in athletics
Athletes (track and field) at the 1971 Mediterranean Games
Athletes (track and field) at the 1975 Mediterranean Games